Pierluca Zizzi is an Italian game designer, inventor and co-author of board games such as Asgard, Signorie and Tang Garden. He is a writer, game design teacher, and lecturer on consciousness development topics.

Early life 
He was born in Turin in 1970 and graduated from the Polytechnic of Turin.

Career 
Zizzi began working as an architect.

Games 
After ten years, he turned to games. He collaborated with Italian authors, such as Andrea Chiarvesio, Martino Chiacchiera, Francesco Testini and others.

His design style inserts strong narrative and setting elements into the rules structure (Dark Tales, Similo, and 3 Secrets). His games range from simple to complex. He loves fantastic or shrouded-in-mystery and investigation settings. Several of his projects have been successful on Kickstarter such as Barbarians: The Invasion, Tang Garden and others.

In 2019, he began teaching game design at the International School of Comics in Turin.

Writer and lecturer 

Pierluca Zizzi is a researcher in the evolution of consciousness, and a writer. He is the author of the book Divinare per Tutti and a series of cards decks for divination (Ascension Tarot, Infinity Tarot, Egyptian Tarot, Folk cards of destiny, Medieval fortune telling cards, Opposition Tarot in 2021 and others).

He is the author of the books Geometria Sacra and Sacred Energia Sacra, the first two volumes of a tetralogy.

Beginning in 2015, he attended conferences on symbolism, intelligent energy of places, modern initiations and human paradigm change. He has been interviewed in many webinars and television broadcasts.

Board games published 

 3 Segreti
Al Rashid
 Arcanum
 Arcanum: The Witch
 Artè
 Asgard
Barbarians the invasion
 Caligula
 Dark Tales
 Dark Tales: Cinderella
 Dark Tales: Little Mermaid
 Dark Tales: Little Red Riding Hood
 Dark Tales: Snow White
 Defence for Agarthi
 Hall of Fame
 Hyperborea
 Hyperborea: Light & Shadow
 Hyperborea: Promo Set
 Lamborghini: The Official Race Game
 Movie Trailer
 Signorie
Similo
 Simurgh
 Simurgh: Call of the Dragonlord
Tang Garden

References 

Architects from Turin
Board game designers
Living people
Year of birth missing (living people)